Madhu Babu (Full Name: Valluru Madhusudana Rao) is a Telugu detective novel writer.

Biography

Madhu Babu's fictional detectives, Shadow, Gangaram, Kulakarni, Mukesh, Bindu, Srikar became very popular during the 1970-1990s. He has also written novels in Telugu weeklies Swathi, Navya and also Nadhi Monthly. He has his own publication house. He has also written film and television scripts. In May 2022, he started his own Podcast channel on YouTube and other mediums as 'Shadow Madhu Babu (Official) Audio Books'. He started his own official Telegram group and Facebook page administered by him.
 
He worked as a head master in Hanuman Junction in Krishna district Andhra Pradesh, Now staying with his son in Hyderabad

Bibliography

Shadow Novels

 2 Miles to the Border
 A Bullet for Shadow
 A Devil A Spy 
 A Journey to Hell
 A Minute in Hell
 Angel of Death
 Assault on Shadow 
 Assignment Karachi
 Assignment Love Bird
 Baba
 Badmaash		
 Banjay
 Bhola Sankar 1
 Bhola Sankar 2
 Blood Hound
 Bloody Border
 Bombing Squad
 Broken Revolver
 Buffalo Hunters
 Burma Doll
 Carnival for Killers
 Chichchara Pidugu
 Chinese Beauty
 Chinese Mask
 Chinese Puzzle
 C.I.D Shadow
 Commander Shadow
 Counterfeit Killers
 Dagger of Shadow
 Dangerous Diabolic 
 Dangerous Game 1
 Dangerous Game 2
 Deadly Spy 1
 Deadly Spy 2 - Death in the Jungle
 Dear Shadow
 Devil's Dinner
 Devils in Nicobar
 Dirty Devil			
 Dr. Shadow
 Dr. Sreekar M.B.B.S
 Dr. Zero
 Donga Donga Donga Pattukondi Pattukondi
 Duel at Double Rock
 Durmargudu
 Dynamite Dora		
 Fighting Four
 Fist of Shadow
 Flying Bomb			
 Flying Falcon
 Flying Horse
 Golden Robe
 Grenade Group	
 Gunfight in Green Land
 Guns in the Night
 Horrors Of Darkness
 Hunter Shadow
 Inspector Shadow
 Junior Agent Sreekar	
 Kendo Warrior
 Kill Quick or Die
 Kill Them Mr. Shadow		
 Killers Gang
 Kiss Kiss Kill Kill
 Kiss Me Darling
 License to Kill
 Lone Wolf
 Mera Naam Rajoola
 Midnight Adventure 1
 Midnight Adventure 2
 Midnight Plus One 1
 Midnight Plus One 2
 Mission to Peking
 Murdering Devils	
 Nalla Thrachu	
 Never Love A Spy
 Night Walker
 Number 28			
 Once Again Shadow
 Operation Arizona
 Operation Bengal Tiger
 Operation Counter Spy
 Operation Double Cross
 Operation Kabul
 Professor Shadow		
 Red Shadow 1
 Red Shadow 2
 Revenge Revenge
 Rudraani
 Run for the Border
 Run for the Highlands
 Run Shadow Run
 Scientist Miss Madhuri
 Scientist Shadow
 Secret Agent Mr. Shadow			
 Seventh Killer			
 Shadow in Baghdad
 Shadow in Borneo
 Shadow in Cochin
 Shadow in Hyderabad
 Shadow in Japan
 Shadow in Sikkim
 Shadow in Thailand
 Shadow in the Jungle
 Shadow The Avenger
 Shadow The Spy King
 Shadow!
 Shadow! Shadow!! 1
 Shadow! Shadow!! 2
 Shadow! Shadow!! Shadow!!!
 Shadow Vasthunnaadu Jaagraththa
 Sicilian Adventure
 Silver King
 Spider Web
 Star Fighter
 Target Five
 Target Shadow
 Taste For Death
 Temple of Death		
 Ten Against Shadow 1
 Ten Against Shadow 2
 Terra-205 1
 Terra-205 2
 Terror Island		
 The Brain Washers
 The Curse of Kung Fu
 The Girl From C.I.B.
 The Killer From C.I.B.
 Tiger Munna
 Time for Love
 To Shadow with Love
 Trouble Makers
 Viplavam Vardhillali
 Wanted Dead or Alive
 Warrior Shadow
 Who are you?
 Yamudu

Novels

 Aarthi
 Aparichithudu
 Athanu
 Bairagi
 Bhavani
 Chakra Theerdham
 Crime Corner
 Death Warrant
 Down Street Mystery
 Final Warning
 Jaguar Jaswanth
 Missing Number
 Paamu
 Please Help Me
 Puli Madugu
 Rahasyam
 Red Alert
 Red Silver
 Rudra Bhoomi
 Shankar Dada 1
 Shankar Dada 2
 Shiksha 1
 Shiksha 2
 Spandana
 Vetti

Fantasy Novels

 Ananda Jyothy
 Chathurnethrudu 1
 Chathurnethrudu 2
 Gandu Cheema
 Kaalakanya
 Kaalanaagu
 Kaalikaalayam 1
 Kaalikaalayam 2 - Kankaalaloya
 Kaalikaalayam 3 - Kalyana Thilakam
 Machchala Gurram
 Madhumaalini
 Marakatha Manjusha
 Narudu
 Rudrudu
 Sasibaala
 Sivudu
 Swarna Khadgam 1
 Swarna Khadgam 2
 Veerabhadra Reddy 1
 Veerabhadra Reddy 2
 Vennela Madugu
 sivangi
 Rudranagu

Vaatsava Shyamsunder Novels

 Bomma
 Dare Devil
 Finishing Touch
 Gharshana
 Hechcharika
 Jwalaamukhi
 Kankana Rahasyam
 Nandini
 Nishabdanaadam
 Red Signal
 Saadhana
 Saalabhanjika
 Shravani
 Tiger Vathsava
 Time Bomb
 Top Secret
 Top Ten
 Touch Me Not
 Two in One
 Virgin Island
 Viswa Prayathnam

TV series

 Chakra Therdam (ETV)
 Kaalikaalayam (Gemini TV)

References
Madhubabu's Own (Official) Audiobook / Podcast Channel
Shadow Novel Writer Madhu Babu Exclusive Interview || Dil Se With Anjali #372. 

Telugu writers
Writers from Andhra Pradesh
Living people
People from Krishna district
1948 births